New Zealand Soil Bureau was a division of the Department of Scientific and Industrial Research specializing in soil-related research and development. Originally formed as the 'soil survey group' of the 'Geological Survey,' they became the 'Soil Survey Division' in 1936 and 'Soil Bureau' in 1945. Established adjacent to Taita College on approximately 90 acres on the Eastern Hills of Lower Hutt north of Wellington, the foyer featured a large mural by Ernest Mervyn Taylor depicting a cloaked figure using a kō (Māori digging stick). Soil Bureau completed nationwide soil surveys of New Zealand.

The impetus for forming a separate unit related to soil science was work in the 1930s by Leslie Grange and Norman Taylor which showed a correspondence between soil type and bush sickness in cattle, which led to the discovery that ash-based soils in the central North Island were Cobalt deficient and that cobalt-enriched salt licks could open up tens of thousands of acres to dairy farming.

Soil Bureau was renamed as DSIR Land Resources in 1990 and then reformed into Landcare Research in 1992 by the Crown Research Institutes Act 1992, but the name remains protected under the Flags, Emblems, and Names Protection Act 1981. Many Soil Bureau publications were digitised by its successor organisation.

Directors 

 Leslie Grange 1936–1952
 Norman Taylor 1952–1962
 Joseph Dixon 1962–1966 
 Morice Fieldes 1966–1973
 Bruce Miller 1973–
 Mike L. Leamy –1987
 Derek Milne 1987–

Further reading
 Manaaki Whenua's Soils Portal and Digital Library contain many of Soil Bureau's research publications in digitised form.
 Appendix to the Journals of the House of Representatives and the Votes and Proceedings of the House of Representatives. by NLNZ contains many annual reports of the Department of Scientific and Industrial Research and related materials.

References 

Government agencies of New Zealand
Agricultural organisations based in New Zealand
Research institutes in New Zealand
1945 establishments in New Zealand
1992 disestablishments in New Zealand